All the still camera films on this page have either been discontinued, have been updated or the company making the film no longer exists. Often films will be updated and older versions discontinued without any change in the name. Films are listed by Brand name.

Photographic films for still cameras that are currently available are in the list of photographic films. Films for movie making are included in the list of motion picture film stocks.

ADOX
Adox was a German camera and film brand of Fotowerke Dr. C. Schleussner GmbH of Frankfurt am Main, the world's first photographic materials manufacturer. In the 1950s it launched its revolutionary thin layer sharp black and white kb 14 and 17 films, referred to by US distributors as the 'German wonder film'. In the 1970s Dupont the new owners of the ADOX brand sold the recipes and machinery of the film (but not the brand name) to Fotokemika in Croatia who continued to produce the films according to the 1950s ADOX formulas under the Efke brand.

Black and white film

Colour reversal (slide) film
 ADOX C15 (1958) Color reversal film
 ADOX C17 (?) Color reversal film
 ADOX C18 (18° DIN, 50 ASA).

ADOX (Fotoimpex)
The current rights to the ADOX name for photographic products were obtained in 2003 by Fotoimpex of Berlin, Germany, a company founded in 1992 to import photographic films and papers from former eastern Europe. This included the Efke films from Fotokemika which were sold branded as 'ADOX CHS Art' re-uniting the ADOX name with the original Schleussner film formula. Fotoimpex established the ADOX Fotowerke GmbH film factory in Bad Saarow outside Berlin to convert and package their films, papers and chemicals. After the closure of Fotokemika in 2012, ADOX subsequently revived the KB100 film as ADOX CHS II.

Black and white negative film

Black and white reversal (slide) film

Colour negative film

AGFA
Originally founded in Berlin, 1867, its name was changed to AGFA (Actien-Gesellschaft für Anilin-Fabrikation) in 1873. The Wolfen factory was established in 1910 and the original Leverkusen works around the same time. By 1925 under IG Farben, Wolfen was specialising in film production and Leverkusen photographic paper. After the war, Agfa was split into two companies: Agfa AG, Leverkusen in West Germany, and VEB Film und Chemiefaserwerk Agfa Wolfen in East Germany. Initially both companies produced films under the AGFA brand with the same names, such as Isopan F. To distinguish them, the film edge markings were L IF for Agfa Leverkusen, and W IF for Agfa Wolfen. After 1964 films from Wolfen were rebranded ORWO (ORiginal WOlfen). See separate listing. Trading of materials however continued between plants.

Agfa AG (Leverkusen), which saw major investment post war in 1952 as a wholly owned subsidiary of Bayer was subsequently merged with Gevaert based in Mortsel, Belgium in 1964 to form Agfa-Gevaert with Bayer subsequently acquiring full ownership of the merged company. Agfa-Gevaert film products continued to be sold under the AGFA 'rhombus' brand. The Mortsel plant specialised in commercial films including aerofilms and Leverkusen in consumer films. Following a public flotation in 1999 Agfa-Gevaert Group became independent from Bayer. The consumer film division, Agfa in Leverkusen, Germany was spun off into a new company AgfaPhoto in 2004 as a management buyout, a time of significant challenges to the traditional film market with the rapid rise of digital photography, resulting in bankruptcy in 7 months, and the closure of the Leverkusen plant in 2005. Production of aerial films continued at the Agfa-Gevaert, Mortsel plant some of which have been subsequently converted for retail sale by Maco Photo Products.

Black and white film
 ISOPAN Ultra (discontinued)
 ISOPAN Fine Grain (Discontinued)
 AGFA Vario-XL (Discontinued) Chromogenic black and white Film that can be developed in C-41 Colour Chemistry.
 Agfaortho 25
 Agfacontour Professional (discontinued) Equidensities generating process B&W sheet film using Agfacontour developer

Black and white reversal (slide) films

Colour negative films

Colour reversal (slide) film

AGFA PHOTO
The AGFA consumer film division with its plant in Leverkusen, Germany was spun off by Agfa-Gevaert into a new company AGFA PHOTO in 2004. At buy out the firm was split into a holding company Agfa-Photo Holding GMBH (licenses) and manufacturing company Agfa-Photo GMBH (leverkusen).  The manufacturing company went bankrupt in 7 months resulting in the closure of the Leverkusen plant in 2005. The holding company was unaffected and retains a trademark license from Agfa-Gevaert for the use of the AgfaPhoto brand and 'red dot' logo on products having a photographic application. Since 2005 these rights for consumer film products have been sub-licensed to Lupus Imaging & Media. After 2005 the colour films were initially made by Ferrania while black and white films continued to be AGFA material converted by Ferrania from cold stored master rolls of AGFA APX. Ferrania itself closed in 2009 and so Lupus procured replacement Agfa Photo branded films from Fujifilm (colour) and Harman/Ilford (black and white).  The contract with Fujifilm ended in early 2018 ending the sale of colour film under the AgfaPhoto brand.

Black and white film

Colour negative film

Colour reversal (slide) films

Azomureș
Azomureș or AZO, produced by Târgu-Mureș Nitrogenous Fertilizer Plant, was the photographic brand of Romania since the 1981. The photosensitive materials plant in Târgu Mureș, a city in northern Romania, covering an area of about 7 hectares. The plant produced black and white and color photographic paper and films for general photography, industrial and medical use and black and white and color cinematographic films. Film production ended in 2003.

The plant was designed by Japan's Fujitsu to withstand a 9.4 degree earthquake on the Richter scale, consequently due to high cost of demolition the company  decided to use the buildings to host cultural events and the photosensitive materials plant was re-opened for this purpose in May 2016.

Black and white film

Dan-Di film
Was a film manufactured in Belgium.

Dan-Di Orthochromatic safety film
 Type: Safety Film - Orthochromatic
 Available formats: 116 N-16(known)
 Speed: Rating of High Speed (?) on box EM-N°
 Granularity:
 Latitude:
 Resolving Power:
 History:
 Primary Usage:

efke

efke was a brand of (mainly, but not limited to) black and white films and photographic paper produced by Fotokemika Zagreb d.d based in Samobor (near Zagreb), Croatia (former Yugoslavia). Fotokemika d.d acquired the rights to the ADOX film recipes and the  production machinery from owners Dupont in the 1970s. As Dupont retained the ADOX brand name, Fotokemika sold the films under the efke brand and continued to manufacture them according to the original 1950s film formulas. The films were also sold by Fotoimpex (Berlin, Germany) under the original ADOX brand name after they acquired the rights to this in 2003. After Fotokemika's closure in 2012, ADOX (Fotoimpex) subsequently revived the KB100 film as ADOX CHS II.

Furthermore Fotokemika had a short lived line of color films and color reversal films called "efkecolor" and "efkechrome" in the 1980s.

Both lines were discontinued in the 1990s due to unknown reasons, presumably due to supply shortages and infrastructural damage as a result of the Yugoslav Wars.

ERA
ERA's factory was originally founded in 1950 in Shantou, China. It was named Shantou ERA Limited Corporation (ERA) in 1999. Its main products were black and white film, resin coated papers and x-ray film. Kodak China acquired an 80% share of their assets in 1998 and reputedly invested in a color film line. Production of film emulsion seem to have ended, c2008.

Ferrania
Ferrania was an Italian filmmaker based in Ferrania (Liguria), Italy founded in 1923 as a maker of photographic film, papers, and photographic equipment, including cameras. The company was purchased in 1964 by the 3M corporation (US) to become Ferrania 3M and made photographic film sold under the 'Scotch' brand. The films and data storage division was spun off from 3M in 1996 becoming Imation. In 1999, Ferrania was acquired by Schroder Ventures and subsequently sold on to Gruppo Messina (Ignazio Messina & Co. S.p.A.) in 2000, as Ferrania Imaging Technology with film being sold again under the Ferrania brand. However photographic film manufacture ended in 2009. Whilst originally a producer of B&W cine/still films such as P30, as Ferrania 3M it became a significant producer of 'white label' consumer colour films for both retailers and traditional B&W film producers needing a colour film to repackage under their own brand. Examples include; Fortecolor film (also supplied by Konica), the Boots UK pharmacy chain color negative products from ca. 1973 until 2003 and AgfaPhoto color negative and slide films from 2005 until plant closure in 2009 (for Lupus Imaging). Ferrania Technology continues to produce chemicals for medical use and solar panels on part of the original factory complex whilst the film plant was demolished. In 2013 a new company was founded as FILM Ferrania to build a film manufacturing company using the former Ferrania Research laboratory building, its coating machine and other equipment salvaged from the original Ferrania production plant prior to its demolition.

Black and white film
 P30 ISO 80. 135, 120, 127. Introduced in 1960 in three versions: Cinema, Leica and Portrait.
 P33 135, 120, 127
 P3 28 DIN. 135
 P36 26 DIN/320 ASA. 120

Color negative film
 Ferrania Solaris From early 2000 by Ferrania Imaging Technologies. It was also sold under different names of imported supermarket chains and under the name of several companies such as Polaroid, Samung and others
 Ferrania Solaris FG 100 135 (2000–2003)
 Ferrania Solaris FG 200 135, APS 110, 12 (2000–2003)
 Ferrania Solaris FG 400 135, APS (2000–2003)
 Ferrania Solaris FG 800 135 (2000–2003)
 Ferrania Solaris FG 100 Plus 135 (2003–2009)
 Ferrania Solaris FG 200 Plus 135, APS (2003–2009) (also 110, 126 to 2007)
 Ferrania Solaris FG 400 Plus 135 (2003–2009) FG 400i to c2005?
 Ferrania Solaris FG 800 Plus 135 (2003–2009) FG 800i to c2005?

Color reversal film
 Ferraniacolor 135, 120, photographic plate. Introduced in 1947 until the 1970s. it was available in sizes 135, 120, photographic plate
 Scotch Chrome ISO 100, 400, 1000. 135.
 Imation Chrome ISO 100, 400. 135.
 Ferrania Solaris Chrome 100 [135]. 2000–2005

FILM Ferrania
FILM Ferrania s.r.l. is a photographic film manufacturing company located in Ferrania (Liguria), Italy. Following closure of the original Ferrania factory in 2009 the company was re-founded in 2013 on a small part of the original site to build a new film manufacturing base using the former Ferrania research laboratory (L.R.F.) and its narrow coater. FILM Ferrania commenced manufacturing a black and white still film in February 2017 based on P30, a classic 1960s motion picture film stock.

Film Photography Project 
Established in 2009 by Michael Raso, Film Photography Project (FPP) sources a variety of still films including those originally made for technical, motion pictures, industrial or aerial applications for creative purposes. Therefore, films are often available for a limited period.

Black and white films

Color negative films

Color reversal (slide) films

Film Washi 
Factory in Saint-Nazaire, France. Film Washi launched in 2013, producing a handcrafted film, handcoated on traditional Washi paper. Also converting other films industrially coated in larger factories and originally made for technical, motion pictures, industrial or aerial applications.

Black and white films

Colour film
 "X" - 400 iso (35mm), C-41 without mask, can be processed in E-6. Discontinued

Forte
Forte (Forte Photochemical Industry VAC) was a Hungarian manufacture of photographic film and paper products originally established in 1922. They ceased to manufacture products in January 2007. Only B&W films were coated by Forte. Colour films were supplied by other manufacturers, and packaged into Forte branding.

Black and white film

Colour negative films

FOTON
FOTON was the brand name of Warszawskie Zaklady Fototechniczne (Warsaw Phototechnical works) a Polish state owned enterprise established in 1949 in Warsaw producing photographic film. The company was established in a surviving building from the former Jozef Franaszek works on Ul. Wolska (Wolska Street) which had produced photographic and other specialised paper. The Franaszek works was burnt out in the Wola massacre in 1944 during the Warsaw Uprising.

The company manufactured X-ray and black and white cinema film, still camera film (from 1950) and microfilm. At the end of the 1950s, FOTONKOLOR cinematographic positive film for making screen copies was launched and for a brief period colour negative film produced in the 1960s until a decision for the GDR (ORWO) to supply colour film in Comecon countries. Black and white papers and plates and photochemicals and later colour photographic papers under the FOTON brand were produced by a sister company at Bydgoskie Photochemical works dating from 1925 also in Warsaw at Ul. Garbary 3 (from 1970s at Ul. Piękna 13). In 1969 FOTON signed a licensing agreement with Ilford for the production of X-ray and photographic film, however various delays meant the new production line was not opened until the late 70s. FOTON ceased producing film in the 1990s. The buildings were taken over by FOTON Trading Sp. z o.o. and now they serve for commercial activity. Bydgoskie Photochemical works was acquired by Foma Bohemia in 1997 but due to decline of the traditional film market was declared bankrupt in 2007.

Black and white film

Colour film

Fuda
Xiamen Fuda Photographic Materials or Fuda was a Chinese manufacturer of photographic material based in Shanghai China. In 1984, Kodak helped Fuda build their color film production line with color film being produced under license from Kodak. Kodak china acquired their assets in 1998.

Black and white film

Colour negative film

Fujifilm
FUJIFILM is a Japanese manufacturer of photographic films, papers and cameras established in 1934. Fujifilm stopped making traditional black and white films and photographic papers in 2018 but in 2019 announced a return to black and white film. They also produce a range of traditional color negative and reversal films (and associated photographic papers and photochemicals) as well as instant film.  See Fujifilm photographic films and List of photographic films. Historically, however, they were one of the major producers of colour negative and slide films producing a wide range of own brand professional and consumer films in competition with Kodak and Agfa-Gevaert. (The other main colour film producers; Konica and 3M Ferrania specialising in 'white label' consumer product). The film range is divided into black and white film Neopan, Color negative film Fujicolor and Colour slide film Fujichrome together with instant 'pack film'. They also undertook contract manufacture for AGFA PHOTO colour negative/slide films from c2008-2018.

Black and white film

Color negative film
 200 ISO (135)
 100 ISO HR
 100 ISO Super HR CN 135/120 (Practical photography July 1989)
 200 ISO Super HR CA 120
 400 ISO Super HR CH 135/120
 1600 ISO Super HR CU 120
 200 ISO Super HQ (135)
 200 ISO Super HG II (135) 4th color-sensitive emulsion layer; Captures true color even under fluorescent lights; Two-Stage Timing DIR Couplers improve color brilliance; Enhance edges for outstanding sharpness
 400 ISO Super HG c1991 on (DIRR couplers, sigma crystal emulsion)
 1600 ISO Super HG (135) 135-36 
 100 ISO Super G (110) ? -1995
 100 ISO Super G Plus (135) 1995-2000 "Plus films" =   "RT   (Real-Tone)  Tech-nology" controls the interlayer (color  saturation  en-hancing) effect to produce natural, fine textured skin tones and  "ELS  (Emulsion Layer Stabilizing) Technology." film stabilser to maintain control the more than 100 organic chemical compounds found in the  Super G Plus films
 200 ISO Super G plus (110, 135) 1995-2000
 400 ISO Super G plus (135, 120) 1995-2000
 800 ISO Super G Plus CZ (135) 1995-2000
 100 ISO Quality (135) (Brazil)
 100 ISO Quality II (135) (Brazil)
 C100 ISO  Basic color film

Colour reversal (slide) film

Instant film

Gigabit
 Type: Black and white
 Speed: ISO 40, DIN 17°
 Available formats: 35 mm
 Granularity: Extremely fine
 Resolving power: Extremely high
 History: said to be Agfa Copex micrography film, sold with special low-contrast developer to increase dynamic range
 Primary usage: General black-and-white photography, with scanning in mind
 General characteristics: PET base for better film flatness, strong contrast and low exposure tolerance, fine grain not much subject to grain aliasing in usual resolution scans
 Discontinued

Ilford
Ilford is a UK manufacturer of photographic materials based in Mobberley, Cheshire known worldwide for its black and white films, papers and chemicals. Following bankruptcy in 2004 it was rescued in a management buy out and is now a brand of Harman Technology Ltd trading as Ilford Photo. Discontinued film versions include:

Black and white film

Colour negative film

Kodak
Eastman Kodak was founded in 1888. During most of the 20th century, Kodak held a dominant position in photographic film. However Kodak struggled to manage the transition to digital photography and filed for Chapter 11 bankruptcy in 2012. Whilst Kodak films for still cameras continue to be manufactured by Eastman Kodak in Rochester, New York, US since its Chapter 11 bankruptcy they are now sold and marketed by Kodak Alaris, a separate company controlled by the Kodak UK Pension fund based in Hertfordshire, UK.

See web page taphilo.com for a list of Kodak film number to film type.

Black and white film

Color negative film

 Kodak Gold 100-3 released in 1992;Kodak Gold 100-4 released in 1994;Kodak Gold 100-5 released in 1995; Kodak Gold 100-6 release in 1997.
 Kodak Gold 400 (Replaced by Ultramax 400 in 2007)
 Kodak Royal Gold 25 (replaced original ektar 25) 1996 on
 Kodak Royal Gold 100 (replaced original ektar) end c2002
 Kodak Royal Gold 200 (replaced original ektar) end c2004
 Kodak Royal Gold 400 (replaced original ektar) 1996-c2004
 Kodak Royal Gold 1000 (replaced original ektar) 1998- ? 
 Kodak High Definition 200 (US) 135-36 /Royal Supra 200 (not US)
 Kodak High Definition 400 (US) 135-24 only/Royal Supra 400 (not US) 135-36
 Kodak Professional Ultra Color 100 135, 120, 220 New 2004 for fashion, advertising, editorial, commercial, travel, and nature photography
 Kodak Professional Ultra Color 400 135, 120, 220 Rebranded Portra UC

Color reversal (slide) film

Kodachrome 25, 64, and 200 Professional

Kodachrome was the first practical color reversal film; essentially first commercially-important color film of any kind. It featured extremely fine grain, high saturation, and extremely high sharpness. Kodachrome entered American popular culture with a 1973 song by Paul Simon, as well as a 2017 Hollywood movie.
  Kodachrome was launched as a 16mm movie film in 1935, with a film speed of ISO 10. The first stills version was released the following year.
 Kodachrome II was introduced in 1961; this was available in daylight balanced speeds of ISO 25 and ISO 64, later rebranded as Kodachrome 25 and Kodachrome 64. Kodachrome 25 ceased production in 2001.
 Kodachrome Type F (for flash; stopped being made in 1950s).
 Kodachrome 200 was introduced in November 1986 and sold through 2007.
 Later Kodachrome Professional 64 and 200 were added.
 Processing purchased with film until Justice Department sued around 1954, claiming this was a monopolistic practice. There were relatively few competitors however, with the complex developing machinery necessary.
 At various times Kodachrome was produced in 126, 120, and 110 stills formats, as well as various movie and cine film formats.
 Also available in larger roll film formats and sheet film (until late 1940s, beginning of 1950s).
 The entire Kodachrome emulsion line was discontinued in 2009. The last processor in the world closed down its Kodachrome line at end of 2010.
 Suggested Replacement: Kodak Ektachrome E100d

Ektachrome Lumiere 100
 Professional Film
 Code LPP 6146
 Launch Date: ?
 Discontinued: ?
 Suggested Replacement: ?
 Type: Medium speed color reversal film providing neutral color balance with enhanced color saturation.
 Speed: Temp/EI/Wratten filter no. (Source: Ektachrome Lumiere 100 Data Sht dtd 11–93)
 5500K/100/none
 3200K/25/80A
 3400K/32/80B
 Processing: E-6
 Formats: 135, 120, cut film.
 Kodak Pub No. E-137, "Kodak Ektachrome Lumiere 100 Professional Film"
 Note: A number of photographers noted this film was too cool under some circumstances.
 EKTACHROME 64 Professional Film
 EKTACHROME 100 Professional Film
 EKTACHROME 100 Plus Professional Film
 EKTACHROME 160T Professional Film
 EKTACHROME 320T Professional Film
 EKTACHROME P1600 Professional Film
 EKTACHROME 400X Professional Film
 Ektachrome E100S
 Ektachrome E100D

Konica
Established 1873 in Japan, Konishiroku (Konica) was a major producer of colour film, cameras and related products, including film development processors and printing technology. Originally Konica film and paper was sold under the brand name of "Sakura" meaning Cherry Blossom in English. Along with 3M Ferrania they were a significant producer of 'white label' consumer color films for both retailers and traditional B&W film producers needing a colour film to repackage under their own brand. Only in later years did they make significant efforts to market film under the Konica brand. In 2003, Konica merged with Minolta to form Konica Minolta. In 2006, the merged company closed down its photo imaging division, which produced color film, color paper, photo chemicals and digital minilab machines (at the time it was the 3rd largest film producer behind Kodak and Fujifilm, AgfaPhoto having collapsed a year earlier). The company produced the following films:

Black and white film
 Sakura Panchro c1946 Format 120
 KONIPAN SS ASA 100 Format 135, 120, Sheet Film
 KONIPAN SSS ASA 200 Format 135
 Konica Infrared 750 nm Format 135, 120

Colour negative film
 Sakuracolor N100 (C-22) (1967-1971)
 Sakuracolor N100 (C-22) (1971-1975)
 Sakuracolor II N100 (1974-c1984) employing a DIR color coupler
 Sakuracolor (C-41) c1975-1980
 Sakuracolor 400 c1976-1984
 SR (c1984-1986) SR 100/ 200/400/1600 Formats 135, Disc (also sold as Sakuracolor SR)
 SR-V (1987) 3200 Format 135 (also sold as Sakuracolor with same names) Monodispersed emulsion
 SR-G (1989-c1994) 100, Format 135
 SR-G 160 Professional, Format 120/220
 Super DD (1990) 100/200/400 Format 135
 GX (1987) 100, 3200 Format 135
 Impresa 50 1991, Format 120 only
 Impresa 100
 Super HR ( ? -c1991)
 Super SR (1991-c1997) 100, 200 Format 135, 110
 Super XG (1993-c1996) 100 Format 135
 VX (c1994-1999) 100, 200 Format 135
 VX Super 100, Format 135
 Centuria (1999). 100/200/400/800 Format 135
 Centuria 100 Format 120
 Centuria Super
 Pro 160, Professional Portrait film Format 135, 120, 220
 Pro 400, Professional Portrait film Format 135, 120, 220 exp2007

Colour reversal (slide) film
 Sakuracolor R-100 (E-4) ( ? -1972)
 Sakurachrome R-100 (E-6) (c1983-c1986)
 Konica Chrome 100 (c1986-1990)

KONO! 
Launched in 2014, KONO! is a small European analogue photographic company based in Austria that produces a range of 'creative' 35mm format films  under both 'Kono!' and 'dubblefilm' brands, the latter in conjunction with mobile app 'dubble'. Most KONO! films are based on stock originally intended for shooting motion pictures, scientific purposes or other places photosensitive emulsions were used. All films are hand rolled onto recycled 135 film cassettes.

Color negative films

Lomography
Headquarters in Vienna, Austria. Lomography is a globally-active organization dedicated to analogue, experimental and creative photography. Lomography offers films under its own brand procured from various manufacturers.

Color negative films

Color reversal (slide) films

Luckyfilm
Lucky Group Corporation in Baoding, Héběi province, China produced a range of colour, black and white, and chromogenic black and white consumer films. Colour film was produced initially in conjunction with Kodak after signing a 20-year partnership which Kodak ended in 2007 after four years. Production of all consumer films ceased in 2012. In 2017 Luckyfilm, an offshoot of Lucky Group re-released an improved black and white film for the consumer market, however this had ceased to be available by 2019.

Black and white film

Color negative film

Maco
Headquarters in Stapelfeld, Germany. Film sales through www.macodirect.de

ORT
 Type: Black and White (orthochromatic)
 Speed: ISO 25, DIN 15°
 Available formats: 35 mm, 120, Sheet Film
 Granularity: Extremely Fine
 Resolving power: Extremely High (>330lp/mm)
 History: evolution of Agfa Ort25c, same emulsion as MACO EM micrography film, evolved later in ORTO25
 Primary usage: Reprography, Micrography, specialty black and white photography
 General characteristics:
 Discontinued

Negra
Negra Industrial, S A. was a film manufacturer based in Barcelona, Spain established c1928 producing black and white negative film, photographic paper and chemicals. Color film was rebranded stock from other producers mainly Konishiroku (Konica) and 3M (Ferrania). Film production appears to have ended in 1984.

Black and white film
 Negra Negrapan 21 (ISO 100) panchromatic film in 135, 120, 127, 110 and 126 sizes. last films expired 1989.

Color negative film 
 Negracolor AR ? -1984 Konica Color
 Negracolor NC80 1970-1973 3M Color Print
 Negracolor NC100 1973-1976 Sakuracolor (Konica)
 Negracolor II 1976-1984 Sakuracolor II (Konica)
 Negracolor 400 1976-1984 Sakuracolor 400 (Konica)

Color reversal (slide) film 
 Negracrome 50 1969-1974 3M color slide

ORWO
After WW2, Agfa was split into two companies: Agfa AG, Leverkusen in West Germany, and VEB Film und Chemiefaserwerk Agfa Wolfen in East Germany. Initially both companies produced films under the AGFA brand with the same names, such as Isopan F. To distinguish them, the film edge markings were L IF for Agfa Leverkusen, and W IF for Agfa Wolfen. In 1953 in a trade agreement it was agreed that VEB Film und Chemiefaserwerk would have the sole rights to the AGFA brand in Eastern Europe and Agfa AG, would retain sole rights to the AGFA brand in the rest of the world. This hampered Wolfens exports and therefore after 1964 films from Wolfen were rebranded ORWO (ORiginal WOlfen). ORWO ceased production of film in 1994 following the collapse of the company after privatisation, after a brief revival re-branding other manufacturers products the company was again insolvent in 1997, the constituent parts sold off. Part of the original factory survives as the Industry and Film museum Wolfen. However the association of the ORWO name with film lives on as a brand of FilmoTec GmbH who since 1998 produce high quality black and white cinema and technical films, based in Wolfen with coating contracted out.  Their cine camera films UN54 and N74 plus are also re-packaged by third parties as still camera film.

Black and white film

Color negative film

Color reversal (slide) - ORWO 9165 process film 
 ORWO UT18 Daylight
 ORWO UT21 Daylight
 ORWO UK14 Tungsten 127
 ORWO UK17
 ORWO NK18 Tungsten 127

Rera 
Rera is a small range of photographic films for 127 (4x4) format roll film cameras assembled in Japan by Kawauso-Shoten. Film is bought in and converted for 127 format and sold through main retailers. Discontinued films include:

Black and white film

Color reversal (slide) film

Perutz
Perutz was a German film manufacturer. It was taken over by Agfa-Gevaert in 1964. Films included.

Polaroid

Instant Roll Film 
 Type 40 - Sepia tone 100/21°
 Type 41 - Orthochromatic 100/21°
 Type 42 - Panchromatic 200/24° One of Polaroid's longest-lasting film stocks
 Type 43 - Panchromatic 200/24° Introduced  for a short while as a higher-end alternative to type 42
 Type 44 - Panchromatic 400/27°
 Type 46 - Panchromatic 800/30° Produced 8 black and white transparencies
 Type 46L - Panchromatic 800/30° Same as 46, but with a slightly larger slides
 Type 47 - Panchromatic 3000/36° Another one of Polaroid's longest-lasting film stocks
 Type 48 - Color 75/20° Polaroid's first color film stock, produced 6 prints instead of the typical 8
 Type 31 - Panchromatic100/21° All films in the 30 series were made for smaller cameras than the 40 series and produced smaller prints
 Type 32 - Panchromatic 200/24°
 Type 37 - Panchromatic 3000/36°
 Type 38 - Color 75/20°
 Type 20 - Panchromatic 3000/36° The 20 series of films were made for use in the Swinger, Polaroid's first budget camera retailing at $19.95 in 1965
 Type 20c - Panchromatic 3000/36° The first black and white Polaroid film to not require a protective coating on the prints

3¼x4¼ instant pack film

4x5 Instant pack film

4x5 instant sheet film 
Type 55
 Type: Black and white Pos/Neg instant film
 Speed: 50/18° (pos), 35/16° (neg)
 Available formats: 4×5 Sheet film
 Granularity:
 Latitude:
 Resolving power:
 History: Discontinued by Polaroid in 2008; production process licensed out
 Primary usage: Test shots, fine art

8x10 instant sheet film

Instant integral film

Instant 35mm slide film 
·Polachrome

Polaroid B.V.
Polaroid B.V. is a Dutch photography company that was founded in 2008 as the 'Impossible Project' to re-introduce instant film for Polaroid cameras. Impossible bought the production machinery from Polaroid for $3.1 million and leased a building, called Building Noord, which was formerly part of the Polaroid plant in Enschede, Netherlands but had to re-invent the emulsions and processes. Polaroid Corporation's brand and intellectual property were acquired by Impossible Project's largest shareholder in 2017 and the company was later renamed 'Polaroid Originals' before becoming 'Polaroid' in 2020. Based in Enschede, Polaroid manufactures film for its own and selected original Polaroid instant cameras. Instant films are marketed by format rather than emulsion.

Rollei
The Rollei brand for photographic film is licensed to Maco (Hans O. Mahn GmbH & Co. KG, Maco Photo Products) a German-based supplier of photographic films. They offer a range of black and white and colour films produced by Agfa-Gevaert and other suppliers. Discontinued films are listed below:

Black and white films

R3
 Speed: ISO 200, DIN 24° (can be used from ISO25 to ISO6400)
 Available formats: 35 mm, 120, Sheet Film
 Granularity: Fine
 Resolving power: High
 History: launched in 2004
 Primary usage: General black and white photography
 General characteristics: Fairly wide latitude, PET base for better film flatness, extended spectral sensitivity from IR to near-UV, to be stored in special black cartridges
 Discontinued

ATO (Advanced Technical Ortho)
 same emulsion as Maco Genius Film
 clear base
 suitable for reversal process

ATP1.1 (Advanced Technical Pan)
 Formats: 120
 Speed: ISO 32
 High resolution Super-panchromatic film (extended red sensitivity).
 Converted and packaged by Foma

Rollei Ortho
 orthochromatic film with a clear base
 spectral sensitivity 380–610 nm
 resolving power of 330 lines/mm (with a fine-grain developer)
 especially suited for digital scanning
 Replaced by Ortho Plus in 2017

Rollei Pan
 ISO 25
 clear base, well suited for black and white slides

Retro Tonal
 same emulsion as Maco PO100C
 an orthopanchromatic ("RectePan") film
 clear base
 suitable for reversal process

RSD
 same emulsion as Agfa Copex Slide Direct
 a pre-fogged orthochromatic film specially for negative or slide duplication
 exposure index (EI) in daylight around 0.2 (thus it has a DIN value of -6 !) = about EI 6 + 5 f stops (not many cameras will handle this correctly)
 after a massive exposure will produce a positive in traditional B&W process, i.e. is NOT run through a reversal process; see also solarisation
 contrast adjustment using different developers, i.e. lower contrast: for ex. Rodinal/Adonal (1:25 about 10 mins., 1:50 about 20 mins.) or higher contrast: any paper developer 1+4 about 5 mins.

Color negative film

Color reversal (slide) film

ScanFilm
 same emulsion as Agfa Aviphot Color X400 without a mask, very well suited for scanning

Silberra 
The company based in Saint Petersburg, Russia was founded in 2009 producing analog film products. It adopted the Silberra name in 2017 to introduce a range of black and white films.

Black and white films

SPUR 
SPUR (Speed Photography & Ultra high Resolution) is a supplier of own brand specialist photochemistry and films based in Langerwehe, Germany.

Street Candy 
Vincent Moschetti, the proprietor of the website OneYearWithFilmOnly.com (later renamed OnFilmOnly.com) released his own branded film in 2018. In April 2022 the founder announced closure of the brand due to rising costs.  Film cassettes are uniquely packaged in cardboard film canisters.

Svema
Svema (Russian: Свема, Светочувствительные Материалы) was the former name ("NPO "Svema") of the Shostka Chemical Plant, located in Shostka, Sumy Oblast, Ukraine. It was founded in 1931 in Ukrainian SSR.

"Svema" was the major photographic film manufacturer in the USSR and the second largest film producer in Europe, but their film lost market share in former Soviet countries to imported products during the late 1990s. They made black-and-white photographic film, photographic paper, B&W/colour cine film and magnetic tapes until 2000. Colour film was made with equipment dismantled from the Agfa-Wolfen Factory after World War II. The plant's production of photographic products slowed through the 1990s and ceased film production entirely in 2003 with the final coating of X-ray films there and the plant closed completely in 2005. After attempts by the state to sell the business, bankruptcy processes were completed in 2015. The coating machinery was sold for scrap and the main buildings were demolished c2018.

A decade prior to the plant's closure a small group of Svema employees had founded Astrum holdings in a rented building on the site in 1995, buying bulk film from various sources which they converted and packaged, for retail sale. Originally sold under the Astrum name (film expiring up to 2019), they later acquired rights to the Svema trademark and now apply the name to a range of films for nostalgic value, but this no longer manufactured in Ukraine, only re-packaged there.

Black and white film
Type 1981(old GOST speed scale)
 Svema FN 32; 32 GOST, ISO 40/17°
 Svema FN 64; 64 GOST, ISO 80/20°; 135, sheet films 6.5×9 cm - 30×40 cm, KB, 6×9", bulk last expired 1/94.
 Svema FN 125; 125 GOST, ISO 160/23°; KB, bulk
 Svema FN 250; 250 GOST, ISO 320/26°; KB, bulk
 Svema Reporter 200 GOST, ISO 200/24° (actually cinematographic filmstock); KB, bulk

Type approximately 1986(old GOST speed scale)
 Svema Foto 32
 Svema Foto 65 (80 ASA)
 Svema Foto 130
 Svema Foto 250

Type 1990(new GOST speed scale, same as ASA)
 Svema Foto 50; ISO 50/18°
 Svema Foto 100; ISO 100/21°; KB, 6×9", bulk last expiry July 4
 Svema Foto 200; ISO 200/24°; KB, bulk
 Svema Foto 400; ISO 400/27°; KB, bulk

Colour negative film
 SVEMA DS-2 45 18DIN 50ASA Negative Color film, 1960s era
 Svema DS-4 Unmasked Color Negative Film 45 GOST (ISO) / 18 DIN / 50 ASA
 Svema DS-5M Color negative film, 50 GOST, 135 bulk
 Svema CND-32 Color Negative Film 32 GOST, ISO 40/17°
 Svema CND-65 Color Negative Film 65 GOST / 20 DIN / 80 ASA
 Svema CNL-65 Color Negative Film, tungsten-balanced, 65 GOST (ISO) / 20 DIN / 80 ASA, 135 format
 Svema CNL-90 Color Negative Film, tungsten-balanced, 80 GOST
 Svema DS-100 Color Negative Film, 100 ISO, C41 process
 Svema LN-9  Color Negative Film, tungsten-balanced, GOST (ISO) / DIN /  ASA, 135 bulk   format

Colour reversal (slide) film
 Svema TSO-2 Color reversal film, 32 GOST, 17 DIN, 35 ASA, 1960s-70s
 Svema CO-32D Color reversal film
 Svema CO-65D Color reversal film, 65 GOST
 Svema CO-50D Color reversal film, 50 GOST (ISO) / 18 DIN / 50 ASA
 Svema CO-90L Tungsten-balanced color reversal film, 90 GOST

All consumer film was produced in 135 and 120 formats, some stocks were also available in sheets, 16mm and 8mm/super 8.

Tasma
Tasma –  in Russian Cyrillic characters was a manufacturer of photographic films located in Kazan, Russia, it has been in operation since 1933 (starting as “Film Factory No. 8”. The name “Tasma” is derived from the Russian phrase «Татарские светочувствительные материалы» “TAtarskie Sveto MAterialiy.” - “TAtar Sensitized Materials;”it was adopted by the company in 1974. Prior to the fall of the Soviet Union, the company offered an array of color photographic products from the year 1950 as well, but these were discontinued following the fall of the Iron Curtain. After the dissolution of the Soviet Union, the company was reorganized as a free enterprise and privatized in 1992. Photographic film production ceased in the 1990s and today they specialise in industrial films including aerial photography films. Films generally supplied without spool in a black paper wrapper and box.

Black and white film
 Tasma 100 Super
 Tasma Foto 32
 Tasma Foto 64
 Tasma Foto 125
 Tasma 65 GOST (ISO) / 20 DIN / 80 ASA 135 format
 Tasma 130 GOST (ISO) / 23 DIN / 160 ASA 135 format
 Tasma 250 GOST (ISO) 135 format

Colour reversal (slide) film
 TASMA ЦО-25 (daylight)

Valca
Valca was a Spanish film manufacturer established in 1940 headquartered in Bilbao. The company name comes from the factory location in Sopeñano, Burgos; Valle de Mena (Mena Valley) through which flows the Rio Cadagua (Cadagua River) which provided cooling water for the factory. The company produced black and white negative film, photographic paper and X ray films. Ilford acquired an equity interest in Valca in 1960, resulting in technical co-operation and Valca acting as Ilford distributors in Spain. The agreement lasted until 1976 when Ilford sold its shares. It was particularly successful in the X-ray film market and in 1991 it had a 17% share of its national market and 1% of the US market, the latter accounting for 60% of production, with 65% of X-ray film exported in total. While black and white film was produced in-house, colour film was rebranded stock from other suppliers. The company underwent re-structuring in 1991 due to financial problems, reportedly due to poor management and the factory finally closed in 1993.

Black and white film
 Valca Sheet Film Autographica – Panchromatica Antihalo
 Valca Sheet Film Retrato V Orthochromatic
 Valca Sheet Film Retrato VV Panchromatic
 Valca Sheet Film Retrato ES Panchromatic
 Valca Diapositiva Dura
 Valca F22 – ASA 125 (sheet film 9×12 cm, 35mm, 120, 620 & 126) Possibly based on FP4.
 Valca H27 – ASA 400 Possibly based on Ilford HP3
 Valca H29 – ASA 400 (sheet film, 35mm, 120) Possibly based on Ilford HP4.

Colour negative films
 Valcolor, 1974-1975 Sakuracolor N100
 Valcolor II – 1975-1977 Sakuracolor II
 Valcolor II – 1977-1980 (35mm, 126, 120, 110) 3M color print 100
 Valcolor HR100 – ? -1991 (35mm & 126) Konica color 100

See also
 List of photographic films

References 

Lists of photography topics